Archibald Fletcher (1746–1828), was a Scottish reformer.

Fletcher was descended from the highland clan of Fletcher, his ancestors, according to tradition, being the first who 'had raised smoke or boiled water on the braes of Glenorchy.' He was the eldest son of Angus Fletcher, a younger brother of Archibald Fletcher of Bennice and Dunans, Argyleshire, by his second wife, Grace m'Naghton, and was born at Pooble in Glen Lyon, in 1746. After attending the grammar school of Kenmore in Breadalbane he entered the high school of Perth in his thirteenth year. He served an apprenticeship to a writer to the signet in Edinburgh, and became confidential clerk to Lord-advocate Sir James Montgomery, who introduced him to Mr. Wilson of Howglen, with whom he became partner. In his earlier years he devoted much of his spare time to study, rising at four in the morning to read Greek, attending a debating society, and enrolling himself in some of the university classes, including that of moral philosophy, where he had as one of his fellow-students Dugald Stewart, with whom he became intimately acquainted. In 1778 he was chosen, on account of his knowledge of Scottish Gaelic, to negotiate with the M'Cra highlanders, who refused to embark at Leith for service in America.

When about this time the Faculty of Advocates brought forward a resolution that no one above the age of twenty-seven should be admitted a member of their body, Fletcher wrote a pamphlet against the proposal, which was so successful that the resolution was withdrawn. The pamphlet gained him the friendship of Henry Erskine. He also distinguished himself by an 'Essay on Church Patronage,’ in which he supported the popular side. In 1784, when burgh reform was first agitated in Scotland, he became secretary of the society then formed in Edinburgh, and drew up the principal heads of a reform bill to be submitted to parliament. He was deservedly called 'father of burgh reform,’ both on account of his initiation of the agitation and the skill and energy with which he directed it. In 1787 he was sent as delegate to London by the Scottish burghs to promote this object, when he gained the friendship of Fox and other leaders. It was not till 1790 that he was called to the Scottish bar. The following year he married Miss Eliza Dawson, a lady of literary tastes.

At first his success at the bar was hindered by his advanced political opinions, but he gradually acquired a considerable practice. He was a supporter of the American war of independence, a prominent abolitionist, and so strong a sympathiser with the French Revolution that he attended every anniversary of the fall of the Bastille from 14 July 1789. He acted without fee as counsel for the political reformer Joseph Gerrald and 'other friends of the people' charged with sedition in 1793, and in 1796 was one of the minority of thirty-eight who opposed the deposition of Henry Erskine, dean of the faculty. In 1816 he retired from the bar on account of declining health, and took up his residence at Parkhill, Stirlingshire.

Still taking a special interest in questions affecting the burghs of Scotland, he published in 1825 'An Examination of the Grounds on which the Convention of Royal Burghs claimed the right of altering and amending the Setts or Constitution of the Individual Burghs.' He died at Auchindinny House, near Edinburgh, 20 December 1828. He is described by Lord Brougham as 'one of the most upright men that ever adorned the profession, and a man of such stern and resolute firmness in public principle as is very rarely found united with the amiable character which endeared him to private society.'

References

1746 births
1828 deaths
People from Perthshire
Archibald
Members of the Faculty of Advocates
British reformers